Kannur Deluxe is a 1969 Indian Malayalam-language thriller film, directed by A. B. Raj and produced by T. E. Vasudevan who wrote the story under the pseudonym V. Devan. It is the first road movie in Malayalam which pivots on a theft that occurs in a bus and stars Prem Nazir, Sheela, Adoor Bhasi. The film was released on 16 May 1969.

Plot

Cast 

Prem Nazir as Thirumeni /CID Officer
Adoor Bhasi as Chanthu, Thirumeni's Assistant/Assi. CID Officer
K. P. Ummer as Venu, K. B. Pillai's Son
Sankaradi as Kammath, a Passenger
Sheela as Lady on the Bus
N. Govindan Kutty as KBS Nair
Jose Prakash as Gopalakrishnan, the thief
T. R. Omana as K G Pillai's wife
Nellikkodu Bhaskaran as Bus Conductor
G. K. Pillai as K. B. Pillai
Paravoor Bharathan as K B Pillai's company manager
 P. Sreekumar K R Radha a Job aspirant
Ammini
Abbas
Kottayam Chellappan
Paappi
K. Radhakrishnan
M. Radhakrishnan

Production 
The film is perhaps the first road movie in Malayalam. A real life incident that occurred at Cherthala in Alappuzha district of Kerala inspired the modus operandi used to arrest the thief in the film. Major portions of the film were shot inside Kannur Deluxe, a KSRTC bus service between Trivandrum and Kannur that was started in 1967 and is still on. The indoor portions were shot at Vahini, Arunachalam, and Newton Studios. I. V. Sasi worked as assistant director in the film.

Soundtrack 
The music was composed by V. Dakshinamoorthy and the lyrics were written by Sreekumaran Thampi.

Historical importance 
The film helped the Kerala State Road Transport Corporation (KSRTC) to win a trademark case against the Karnataka Road Transport Corporation by submitting its scenes with the KSRTC logo as prime evidence. The scenes were used to prove that the Transport Corporation existed in Kerala even before the Karnataka RTC.

References

External links 
 

1960s Malayalam-language films
1960s thriller films
1969 films
Films set in Kerala
Films shot in Kannur
Films shot in Thiruvananthapuram
Indian road movies
Indian thriller films